Sarko usually refers to Nicolas Sarkozy, President of France 2007–2012.

Sarko may also refer to:
 Anita Sarko (1947–2015), DJ from Detroit
 Šarko shower, a massaging shower for medical purposes
 Sarko, a fictional character of DC Comics' Green Lantern Corps